Goshen is a city in and the county seat of Elkhart County, Indiana, United States.  It is the smaller of the two principal cities of the Elkhart-Goshen Metropolitan Statistical Area, which in turn is part of the South Bend-Elkhart-Mishawaka Combined Statistical Area.  It is located in the northern part of Indiana near the Michigan border, in a region known as Michiana.  Goshen is located 10 miles southeast of Elkhart, 25 miles southeast of South Bend, 120 miles east of Chicago, and 150 miles north of Indianapolis. The population was 34,517 at the 2020 census.

The city is known as an extremely prominent recreational vehicle and accessories manufacturing center, the home of Goshen College, a small Mennonite liberal arts college, and the Elkhart County 4-H Fair, one of the largest county fairs in the United States.

History
Before the arrival of white colonists, the land that is today Goshen, Indiana, was populated by Native Americans, specifically the Miami people, the Peoria people, and Potawatomi Peoples. These people inhabited this land for thousands of years. In 1830, the US Congress passed the Indian Removal Act, requiring all indigenous people to relocate west of the Mississippi River.

Goshen was platted in 1831. It was named after the Land of Goshen.   The initial settlers consisted entirely of old stock "Yankee" immigrants, who were descended from the English Puritans who settled New England in the 1600s. The New England Yankee population that founded towns such as Goshen considered themselves the "chosen people," and identified with the Israelites of the Old Testament and they thought of North America as their Canaan.  They founded a large number of towns and counties across what is known as the Northern Tier of the upper midwest.  It was in this context that Goshen was named.

The Yankee migration to Indiana was a result of several factors, one of which was the overpopulation of New England. The old-stock Yankee population had large families, often bearing up to ten children in one household.  Most people were expected to have their own piece of land to farm, and due to the massive and nonstop population boom, land in New England became scarce as every son claimed his own farmstead.  As a result, there was not enough land for every family to have a self-sustaining farm, and Yankee settlers began leaving New England for the Midwestern United States.

They were aided in this effort by the construction and completion of the Erie Canal which made traveling to the region much easier, causing an additional surge in migrants coming from New England.  Added to this was the end of the Black Hawk War, which made the region much safer for white settlers to travel through and settle in. However, the Black Hawk War also forced the native people who called Goshen home for so long to leave. The 1833 Treaty of Chicago ultimately set the conditions that would force the Potawatomi in particular to leave the Midwest, Goshen included, in 1837. This forced exile is known today as the Potawatomi Trail of Death.

These settlers were primarily members of the Congregational Church, though due to the Second Great Awakening, many of them had converted to Methodism, and some had become Baptists before coming to what is now Indiana. The Congregational Church has subsequently gone through many divisions, and some factions, including those in Goshen, are now known as the Church of Christ and the United Church of Christ.  When the New Englanders arrived in what is now Elkhart County there was nothing but a dense virgin forest and wild prairie. They laid out farms, constructed roads, erected government buildings, and established post routes.

On Palm Sunday, April 11, 1965, a large outbreak of tornadoes struck the Midwest. The most famous pair of tornadoes devastated the Midway Trailer Park (now inside the city limits of Goshen), and the Sunnyside Housing Addition in Dunlap, Indiana. Another, smaller F4 tornado also struck neighborhoods on the southeast side of Goshen on the same day. Statewide, 137 Hoosiers died in the storms—55 of them in Elkhart County. Days later, President Lyndon B. Johnson visited the Dunlap site.

The Goshen Historic District, added in 1983 to the National Register of Historic Places is bounded by Pike, RR, Cottage, Plymouth, Main, Purl, the Canal, and Second Sts. with the Elkhart County Courthouse at its center.

In April 2006, Goshen was the site for an immigration march. Officials estimated that from 2000 to 3000 people marched from Linway Plaza to the County Courthouse.

For much of its history, Goshen was a "sundown town", forbidding African Americans from living in, or entering, the town, often under threat of violence. In March 2015, the city acknowledged this part of its past, apologizing and saying it no longer condones such behavior. A documentary made at Goshen College, "Goshen: A Sundown Town's Transformation," tells the story. 

The Elkhart County Courthouse, Fort Wayne Street Bridge, Goshen Carnegie Public Library, Goshen Historic District, William N. Violett House, and Violett-Martin House and Gardens are listed on the National Register of Historic Places.

Geography
The Elkhart River winds its way through the city and through a dam on the south side making the Goshen Dam Pond. Rock Run Creek also runs through town. The city is divided east/west by Main Street and north/south by Lincoln Avenue.

Environmental leadership 
In February 2018, the Elkhart River flooded as a result of heavy rain and snowmelt. The river rose to a record 13.2 feet, damaging more than 300 structures and prompting evacuations. City government has responded to the increase in severe weather such as flooding, hail, and heavy rains with measures including stormwater management, and "an initiative to grow the town’s tree canopy by 45%."  Goshen completed 92 solar projects in 2019. Goshen outranked Phoenix, Sacramento, Los Angeles, San Francisco, and Denver with its 2019 production of 116 watts of solar power per capita.

Demographics

2020 census

Note: the US Census treats Hispanic/Latino as an ethnic category. This table excludes Latinos from the racial categories and assigns them to a separate category. Hispanics/Latinos can be of any race.

2010 census
As of the census of 2010, there were 31,719 people, 11,344 households, and 7,580 families residing in the city. The racial makeup of the city was 78.2% White, 2.6% African American, 0.5% Native American, 1.2% Asian, 14.8% from other races, and 2.7% from two or more races. Hispanic or Latino of any race were 28.1% of the population.

There were 11,344 households, of which 36.1% had children under the age of 18 living with them, 47.4% were married couples living together, 13.1% had a female householder with no husband present, 6.3% had a male householder with no wife present, and 33.2% were non-families. 27.4% of all households were made up of individuals, and 13.2% had someone who was 65 years of age or older living alone. The average household size was 2.67, and the average family size was 3.23.

The median age in the city was 32.4 years. 27.4% of residents were under 18; 11.3% were between the ages of 18 and 24; 26.1% were from 25 to 44; 20% were from 45 to 64, and 14.9% were 65 years of age or older. The gender makeup of the city was 48.9% male and 51.1% female.

2000 census
As of the census of 2000, there were 29,383 people, 10,675 households, and 7,088 families residing in the city. The racial makeup of the city was 83.15% White, 1.53% Black or African American, 0.26% Native American, 1.10% Asian, 0.02% Pacific Islander, 12.00% from other races, and 1.94% from two or more races. 19.33% of the population were Hispanic or Latino of any race.

There were 10,675 households, of which 32.6% had children under 18 living with them, 50.8% were married couples living together, 10.1% had a female householder with no husband present, and 33.6% were non-families. 27.5% of all households were made up of individuals, and 12.5% had someone living alone who was 65 years of age or older. The average household size was 2.61, and the average family size was 3.14.

In the city, the population was spread out, with 25.9% under 18, 12.9% from 18 to 24, 30.0% from 25 to 44, 17.6% from 45 to 64, and 13.6% who were 65 years of age or older. The median age was 32 years. For every 100 females, there were 100.6 males. For every 100 females aged 18 and over, there were 97.7 males.

The median income for a household in the city was $39,383, and the median income for a family was $46,877. Males had a median income of $32,159 versus $23,290 for females. The per capita income for the city was $18,899. About 6.0% of families and 9.3% of the population were below the poverty line, including 11.8% of those under age 18 and 5.3% of those aged 65 or over.

Economy
Industry in Goshen centers around the automotive and Recreational Vehicle business. There are automotive component manufacturers such as Benteler; firms that build custom bodies onto chassis such as Supreme, Independent Protection, and Showhauler Trucks.  RV manufacturing companies include Dutchmen, Forest River, and Keystone.

Government
The government consists of a mayor, a clerk-treasurer, a city council, and a youth advisor. The mayor and clerk are elected in a citywide vote. The city council consists of seven members. Five are elected from individual districts. Two are elected at large. The youth advisor position was added in 2016 and is elected by the students of Goshen High School. Jeremy Stutsman, a member of the  Democratic Party, is the incumbent Mayor of Goshen.

Education
Goshen Community Schools serves the portion of the city in Elkhart Township. This system consists of seven elementary schools, Goshen Intermediate School, Goshen Junior High School, and Goshen High School.

In 2012, U.S. News & World Report ranked Goshen High School as the 12th best high school in Indiana and the top 6% of high schools in the country.

Additionally, Goshen is served by Bethany Christian Schools, a private Christian school for grades 4-12.

Small parts of the city of Goshen are covered by several other school districts, including Fairfield Community Schools, Middlebury Community Schools, Concord Community Schools, and WaNee Community Schools.

Goshen College, located on the south side of town, has an enrollment of approximately 800, with 40% male and 60% female.  Tuition and fees for the 2017–2018 year were $33,200.

The town has a free lending library, the Goshen Public Library.

Transportation

Airports
Goshen Municipal Airport is a public-use airport located about 3.5 miles southeast of downtown Goshen. The Goshen Board of Aviation Commissioners owns the airport.

Bus
The Interurban Trolley bus connects Goshen to the nearby city of Elkhart and the unincorporated town of Dunlap via Concord and Elkhart-Goshen routes. The routes pass at Elkhart's Amtrak station, allowing passengers to connect to the Capitol Limited and Lake Shore Limited trains. Riders can also transfer to the North Pointe and Bittersweet/Mishawaka routes. The former allows riders to connect to Elkhart's Greyhound bus station, while the later connects the riders to the city of Mishawaka and town of Osceola. The Bittersweet/Mishawaka route also allows them to transfer to TRANSPO Route 9 to connect to destinations throughout the South Bend-Goshen metropolitan region and the South Shore Line's South Bend International Airport station.

Recreation

Goshen has seven parks and has a few different greenways and trails winding through the city, one of which runs along the old Mill Race and hydraulic canal, which was once used to power an old hydroelectric power plant.  Plans were drawn up in 2005 call for the plant to be reopened and redevelopment to begin along the canal.

The Pumpkinvine Nature Trail runs from Goshen to Middlebury and Shipshewana, along the former Pumpkin Vine Railroad. The trail starts northeast of Goshen at Abshire Park. It is one of the recreational highlights of Goshen.  Along with the Maple City Greenway and the Millrace trail, they provide many miles of easily accessible trails for walking, running, and biking.

The Elkhart County Fairgrounds are also located in the city, where the Elkhart County 4-H Fair is held in late July.  It is the largest county fair in Indiana and one of the largest 4-H County Fairs in  the United States.

The Goshen Air Show is also an annual event that takes place at the Goshen Municipal Airport.

In 2007, Downtown Goshen, Inc., a public-private partnership formed from the merger of Face of the City and the Downtown Action Team, started a First Fridays program. Occurring year round, First Fridays happens on the first Friday of each month with stores open until 9, music and other entertainment, and other events occurring within Goshen's downtown district.

One favorite pastime of Goshen residents is driving cars.

Culture
The south side Wal-Mart is rumored to be the first Wal-Mart in the United States to provide a covered stable for its frequent Amish customers. The Amish built the stable with lumber and other supplies donated by Wal-Mart.

Lonesome Jim (2005) which was written by former resident James Strouse, directed by Steve Buscemi and starred Liv Tyler and Casey Affleck, was shot in Goshen.

Notable people

Politicians
 John Baker, U.S. Representative from Indiana (1832–1915)
 Ebenezer M. Chamberlain, U.S. Representative from Indiana (1805–1861)
 Joseph Hutton Defrees, U.S. Representative from Indiana (1812–1885)
 Charles W. Miller, Indiana Attorney General, Mayor of Goshen
 Joseph Mitchell, Justice of the Indiana Supreme Court, third Mayor of Goshen

Entertainment
 James Carew, silent film actor (1876–1938)
 Howard Hawks, film director (1896–1977)
 Kenneth Hawks, film director (1898-1930)
 Philip Proctor, comedian and actor, Firesign Theatre (b. 1940)
 Raymond L. Schrock, screenwriter (1892–1950)
 Tim Showalter, musician  (Strand of Oaks)
 James C. Strouse, screenwriter
 Jordon Hodges, actor

Sports
 Shek Borkowski, coach of Haiti national soccer team
 Rick Mirer, NFL quarterback
 Patricia Roy, AAGPBL player; IHSAA Commissioner
 Doug Weaver, college football player and head coach
 Justin Yoder, soap box racer

Other
 Frederick A. Herring, physician and botanist (1812-1908)
 Ida Shepard Oldroyd, conchologist and curator (1856–1940)
 Lois Gunden, a Righteous Among the Nations (1915–2005)
 Kate Bolduan, CNN anchor
 Andrew Tate, a social media influencer

Sister cities
Goshen has two sister cities as designated by Sister Cities International.

 Bexbach, Saarland, Germany
 Emmeloord, Flevoland, Netherlands

See also

References

External links

 Official website
 Goshen Chamber of Commerce
 Goshen on citydata.com – collection of statistics and graphs of Goshen demographics.
 Pumpkinvine Nature Trail

 
Cities in Elkhart County, Indiana
County seats in Indiana
Cities in Indiana
Sundown towns in Indiana
1831 establishments in Indiana
populated places established in 1831